A Dog Named Palma is a 2021 Russian children's drama film film directed by Aleksandr Domogarov Jr., based on real events that took place in 1974-1976 at the Moscow's Vnukovo International Airport.

It was released theatrically on March 18, 2021 by Central Partnership.

Plot 
In 1977 Soviet Union, the owner of a German Shepherd named Palma flies abroad. But Palma hides at the airport and waits for her owner. She meets a boy named Kolya Lazarev, who has lost his mother, and they become best friends.

Cast 
 Viktor Dobronravov as Vyacheslav Lazarev, an aircraft commander
 Liliya (German Shepherd) as Palma
 Leonid Basov as Kolya Lazarev, a boy
 Vladimir Ilyin as Sergey Tikhonov, an airport technician, Nina Tikhonova's father
 Valeriya Fedorovich as Nina Tikhonova, a stewardess, Sergey Tikhonov's daughter
 Evgeniya Dmitrieva as Lyubov Zhurina, head of the flight squad of OJSC "Soviet Aeroflot"
 Igor Khripunov as Evgeny Golikov, head of the Soviet Security Service
 Pavel Maykov as Georgy Krasilov, co-pilot
 Vladimir Simonov as Ivan Lysko
 Yan Tsapnik as Igor Polsky, owner of the shepherd Palma
 Filipp Savinkov as Kravchenko, a male flight attendant
 Darya Luzina as Anna, a flight attendant
 Elena Anisimova as Raisa Semenovna, an aviation cashier
 Bain Bovaldinov as Fedya, a policeman

Production
In 1976 the Komsomol Truth published an article about this called Waiting for Two Years, written by Yuri Rost, in 1988, based on the article, a feature film was made Tethered to the Runway (ru), directed by Vladimir Khmelnitsky.

Casting
More than 300 children passed the casting for the role of the boy Kolya Lazarev, before the director approved Leonid Basov. For him, this is his film debut.

Filming
Principal photography of the film took place in one of the airports near Moscow and the Belarusian Brest. The local airport, which retained its Soviet interiors and was not very busy, was best suited to reproduce the atmosphere of the 70s. About 500 residents of Brest were used as extras for the crowd scenes.

Release
The Russian premiere of the film took place on March 18, 2021 by Central Partnership.

References

External links 
 

2021 films
2020s Russian-language films
2020s children's drama films
Russian children's drama films
Russian children's adventure films
Russian adventure drama films
Films about dogs
Films about aviators
Films set in airports
Films set in the Soviet Union
Films shot in Moscow
Films shot in Russia
Films shot in Belarus
Mars Media films